In computational complexity the decision tree model is the model of computation in which an algorithm is considered to be basically a decision tree, i.e., a sequence of queries or tests that are done adaptively, so the outcome of previous tests can influence the tests performed next.

Typically, these tests have a small number of outcomes (such as a yes–no question) and can be performed quickly (say, with unit computational cost), so the worst-case time complexity of an algorithm in the decision tree model corresponds to the depth of the corresponding decision tree. This notion of computational complexity of a problem or an algorithm in the decision tree model is called its decision tree complexity or query complexity.

Decision trees models are instrumental in establishing lower bounds for complexity theory for certain classes of computational problems and algorithms. Several variants of decision tree models have been introduced, depending on the computational model and type of query algorithms are allowed to perform.

For example, a decision tree argument is used to show that a comparison sort of  items must take  comparisons. Comparison sorts can be expressed as a decision tree in this model, since such sorting algorithms only perform these types of queries.

Comparison trees and lower bounds for sorting

Decision trees are often employed to understand algorithms for sorting and other similar problems; this was first done by Ford and Johnson.

Assuming that the items to be sorted are all distinct and comparable, this can be rephrased as a yes-or-no question: is ?

These algorithms can be modeled as binary decision trees, where the queries are comparisons: an internal node corresponds to a query, and the node's children correspond to the next query when the answer to the question is yes or no. For leaf nodes, the output corresponds to a permutation  that describes how the input sequence was scrambled from the fully ordered list of items. (The inverse of this permutation, re-orders the input sequence.)

One can show that comparison sorts must use  comparisons through a simple argument: for an algorithm to be correct, it must be able to output every possible permutation of  elements; otherwise, the algorithm would fail for that particular permutation as input. So, its corresponding decision tree must have at least as many leaves as permutations:  leaves. Any binary tree with at least  leaves has depth at least , so this is a lower bound on the run time of a comparison sorting algorithm. In this case, the existence of numerous comparison-sorting algorithms having this time complexity, such as mergesort and heapsort, demonstrates that the bound is tight.

This argument does not use anything about the type of query, so it in fact proves a lower bound for any sorting algorithm that can be modeled as a binary decision tree. In essence, this is a rephrasing of the information-theoretic argument that a correct sorting algorithm must learn at least  bits of information about the input sequence. As a result, this also works for randomized decision trees as well.

Other decision tree lower bounds do use that the query is a comparison. For example, consider the task of only using comparisons to find the smallest number among  numbers. Before the smallest number can be determined, every number except the smallest must "lose" (compare greater) in at least one comparison. So, it takes at least  comparisons to find the minimum. A similar argument works for general lower bounds for computing order statistics.

Linear and algebraic decision trees

Linear decision trees generalize the above comparison decision trees to computing functions that take real vectors  as input. (Algorithms in this model can only depend on the sign of the output.) From its definition, linear decision trees can only specify functions  whose fibers can be constructed by taking unions and intersections of half-spaces.

Algebraic decision trees are a generalization of linear decision trees that allow the test functions to be polynomials of degree . Geometrically, the space is divided into semi-algebraic sets (a generalization of hyperplane).

These decision tree models, defined by Rabin and Reingold, are often used for proving lower bounds in computational geometry. For example, Ben-Or showed that element uniqueness (the task of computing , where  is 0 if and only if there exist distinct coordinates  such that ) requires an algebraic decision tree of depth . This was first showed for linear decision models by Dobkin and Lipton. They also show a  lower bound for linear decision trees on the knapsack problem, generalized to algebraic decision trees by Steele and Yao.

Boolean decision tree complexities 

For Boolean decision trees, the task is to compute the value of an n-bit Boolean function  for an input . Each query may be dependent on previous queries. There are many types of computational models using decision trees that could be considered, admitting multiple complexity notions, called complexity measures.

Deterministic decision tree
The depth of a tree is the maximum number of queries that can happen before a leaf is reached and a result obtained.

Randomized decision tree
One way to define a randomized decision tree is to add additional nodes to the tree, each controlled by a probability . Another equivalent definition is to define it as a distribution over deterministic decision trees.

 is known as the Monte Carlo randomized decision-tree complexity, because the result is allowed to be incorrect with bounded two-sided error. The Las Vegas decision-tree complexity  measures the expected depth of a decision tree that must be correct (i.e., has zero-error).

Nondeterministic decision tree
The nondeterministic decision tree complexity of a function is known more commonly as the certificate complexity of that function. It measures the number of input bits that a nondeterministic algorithm would need to look at in order to evaluate the function with certainty.

The analogous notion where one only requires the verifier to be correct with 2/3 probability is denoted .

Quantum decision tree
The quantum decision tree complexity  is the depth of the lowest-depth quantum decision tree that gives the result  with probability at least  for all .

These notions are typically bounded by the notions of degree and approximate degree.

Relationships between boolean function complexity measures

Finding the best upper bounds in the converse direction is a major goal in the field of query complexity.

All of these types of query complexity are polynomially related. Blum and Impagliazzo, Hartmanis and Hemachandra, and Tardos independently discovered that . Noam Nisan found that the Monte Carlo randomized decision tree complexity is also polynomially related to deterministic decision tree complexity: .  (Nisan also showed that .) A tighter relationship is known between the Monte Carlo and Las Vegas models: . This relationship is optimal up to polylogarithmic factors. As for quantum decision tree complexities, and this bound is tight. Midrijanis showed that , improving a quartic bound due to Beals et al.

It is important to note that these polynomial relationships are valid only for total Boolean functions.

Sensitivity conjecture 

Sensitivity is related to the notion of total influence from the analysis of Boolean functions, which is equal to average sensitivity over all .

One can show through a simple argument that , so the conjecture is specifically concerned about finding a lower bound for sensitivity. Since all of the previously-discussed complexity measures are polynomially related, the precise type of complexity measure is not relevant. However, this is typically phrased as the question of relating sensitivity with block sensitivity.

Since block sensitivity takes a maximum over more choices of subsets, . Further, block sensitivity is polynomially related to the previously discussed complexity measures; for example, Nisan's paper introducing block-sensitivity showed that . In 1992, Nisan and Szegedy conjectured that  suffices. This would be tight, as Rubinstein in 1995 showed a quadratic separation between sensitivity and block sensitivity.

In July 2019, 27 years after the conjecture was initially posed, Hao Huang from Emory University proved the sensitivity conjecture, showing that . This proof is notably succinct, proving this statement in two pages when prior progress towards the sensitivity conjecture had been limited.

Summary of known results 

This table summarizes results on separations between Boolean function complexity measures. The complexity measures are, in order, deterministic, zero-error randomized, two-sided-error randomized, certificate, randomized certificate, block sensitivity, sensitivity, exact quantum, degree, quantum, and approximate degree complexities.

The number in the -th row and -th column denotes bounds on the exponent , which is the infimum of all  satisfying  for all boolean functions . For example, the entry in the D-th row and s-th column is "3, 6", so  for all , and there exists a function  such that .

See also 
 Comparison sort
 Decision tree
 Aanderaa–Karp–Rosenberg conjecture
 Minimum spanning tree#Decision trees

References

Surveys
 

Computational complexity theory
Models of computation
Decision trees